Angelique or Angélique is a feminine French given name. Notable people with the name include:

 Angélique Arnaud (1799–1884), French writer
 Angélique de Saint-Jean Arnauld d'Andilly (1624–1684), French Jansenist nun and writer
 Angelique Bates, (born 1979), American actress
 Angelique Boyer (born 1988), French-born Mexican actress, model, and singer
 Angélique Brûlon (1772–1859), French soldier
 Angélique Bullion (17th century), French benefactress
 Angelique Burgos (born 1978), Puerto Rican television host and actress
 Angélique du Coudray (1715–1794), French midwife
 Angélique de Froissy (1702–1785), French noblewoman
 Angelique Gerber (born 1983), South African actress
 Angélique D'Hannetaire (1749–1822), French actress
 Angelique Hoorn (born 1975), Dutch show jumper
 Angelique Kerber (born 1988), German tennis player
 Angélique Kidjo (born 1960), Beninese musician
 Angelique Magito ((1809–1895), Swedish singer and actress
 Angelique Morgan (born 1975), French adult film actress and reality television participant
 Angelique Pettyjohn (1943–1992), American actress
 Angélique de Rouillé (1756–1840), Belgian writer
 Angelique Seriese (born 1968), Dutch judoka
 Angélique Spincer (born 1984), French team handball player
 Angelique Taai (born 1987), South African cricketer
 Angélique Victoire, Comtesse de Chastellux (1752–1816), French noblewoman
 Angelique Walker-Smith (born 1958), African-American Baptist minister
 Angelique Widjaja (born 1984), Indonesian tennis player

In fiction:
 Angelique Bouchard Collins, a character from the television series Dark Shadows
 Angélique de Sancé de Monteloup, fictional heroine of Angelique (French series)
 Angelique Limoges, protagonist of Angelique (Japanese series)

See also
 Angelica (disambiguation)
 Angelique (disambiguation)
 Angela (disambiguation)
 Angie (given name)
 
 

French feminine given names